Vertex, vertices or vertexes may refer to:

Science and technology

Mathematics and computer science
Vertex (geometry), a point where two or more curves, lines, or edges meet
Vertex (computer graphics), a data structure that describes the position of a point
Vertex (curve), a point of a plane curve where the first derivative of curvature is zero
Vertex (graph theory), the fundamental unit of which graphs are formed
Vertex (topography), in a triangulated irregular network
Vertex of a representation, in finite group theory

Physics
Vertex (physics), the reconstructed location of an individual particle collision
Vertex (optics), a point where the optical axis crosses an optical surface
Vertex function, describing the interaction between a photon and an electron

Biology and anatomy
Vertex (anatomy), the highest point of the head
Vertex (urinary bladder), alternative name of the apex of urinary bladder  
Vertex distance, the distance between the surface of the cornea of the eye and a lens situated in front of it
Vertex presentation, a head-first presentation at childbirth

Businesses
Vertex (company), an American business services provider
Vertex Holdings, an investment holding company in Singapore
Vertex Inc, an American tax compliance software and services company 
Vertex Pharmaceuticals, an American biotech company
Vertex Railcar, a Chinese-American manufacturer of railroad rolling stock 2014–2018
Vertex Resource Group, a Canadian environmental services company

Other uses
Vertex (album), by Buck 65, 1997
Vertex (band), formed in 1996
Vertex (astrology), the point where the prime vertical intersects the ecliptic

See also 

Virtex (disambiguation)
Vortex (disambiguation)
Vertex model, a type of statistical mechanics model
Vertex operator algebra in conformal field theory